Salvia liguliloba is an annual herb that is native to Anhui and Zhejiang provinces in China. It grows on hillside forests at  elevation. Inflorescences are 2-12 flowered widely spaced verticillasters in terminal racemes, with a  reddish corolla.

Notes

liguliloba
Flora of Zhejiang